The Most Honourable Privy Council of Thailand is a body of appointed advisors to the Monarchy of Thailand. The council, as the Constitution of Thailand stipulates, must be composed of no more than eighteen members. The council is led by the President of the Privy Council of Thailand, currently occupied by former Prime Minister Surayud Chulanont since 27 May 2019. The king alone appoints all members of the council. The council's offices are in the Privy Council Chambers, Phra Nakhon District, Bangkok.

In recent years the council and its president in particular, have been accused of interfering in politics. This stems from the council's closeness to the military, in particular during the 2006 Thai coup d'état. General Prem was reappointed president of the privy council by the King Maha Vajiralongkorn on 2 December 2016, although in 2018 the office was stripped of some of its powers.

History

The first privy council in Siam was established by a royal decree on 8 May 1874, by King Chulalongkorn (or Rama V). The king, educated by Westerners, was keen on copying the system of government of the absolute monarchs of Europe. At first he created two councils: the "Privy Council of Siam" (49 members) and the "Council of State" (12 members, name later changed to "Council of Ministers"). The privy council was created to deal with legislative affairs while the latter became an early version of the cabinet.

Chulalongkorn was succeeded by his son King Vajiravudh (Rama VI) in 1910, who at the beginning of his reign appointed a 40-member "Privy Council of State". The king, during his 15 years on the throne, would continue to appoint new members at Thai New Year (or 4 April). When he died in 1925 the privy council was composed of 233 members.

King Prajadhipok (Rama VII) who succeeded his brother in 1925, completely overhauled the system and created instead three councils: The "Supreme Council of State of Siam" (composed of five senior princes, equivalent to the former Council of State); The "Council of Secretaries" (former Council of Ministers); and the Privy Council of State. The role of the Privy Council was relegated to minor legislative affairs, while the Supreme Council became Prajadhipok's main body of advisors.

On 24 June 1932, a group calling themselves the Khana Ratsadon (or People's Party), together with the military, seized power in Bangkok. They abolished the system of absolute monarchy, changing Siam into a parliamentary constitutional monarchy and demanding of Prajadhipok a constitution for the people of Siam. The king granted them a "temporary" constitution in the same month and a permanent one in December. The Khana Ratsadon, once in power, abolished the Supreme Council and the Privy Council. They replaced the Council of Secretaries with the People's Committee of Siam.

It was not until fifteen years later that the 1947 constitution of Siam recreated the Privy Council under King Bhumibol Adulyadej, with a name change to "Supreme Council of State". This council existed from 1947 to 1949 and was composed of:

 Prince Rangsit Prayurasakdi, Prince of Chainat, President of the council
 Prince Dhani Nivat, Prince Bidyalabh Bridhyakon
 Prince Alongkot, Prince Adisorn Udomsak
 Phraya Manavaratsevi (Plod Vichear na Songkhla)
 Police General Adul Aduldejjarus

The Privy Council in its current form was created by the 2017 Constitution of Thailand.

Members
The present constitution stipulated that the council is composed of no more than eighteen members. The members of the Privy Council or Privy Councillors are appointed and removed at the pleasure of the king alone, but appointments must be countersigned by the President of the Privy Council.

The councillors cannot be partisan and therefore cannot be members of the House of Representatives, Senate of Thailand, Election Commission, Ombudsman, member of the National Human Rights Commission, judge of the Constitutional Court, judge of an Administrative Court, member of the National Counter Corruption Commission, member of the State Audit Commission, a government official holding a permanent position or receiving a permanent salary, an official of a state enterprise, other state official or holder of other position of member or official of a political party, and must not manifest loyalty to any political party. Privy councillors are not prohibited from sitting on the boards of influential companies and, under Prem, some councillors are board members of Bangkok Bank, Charoen Pokphand, the Boonrawd group, and the Charoen Siriwatanapakdi business group.

After being appointed the councilors must take the following oath in the presence of the king to assume office:

"I, (name of the declarer), do solemnly declare that I will be loyal to His Majesty the King and will faithfully perform my duties in the interests of the country and of the people. I will also uphold and observe the Constitution of the Kingdom of Thailand in every respect."

A councillor vacates office upon death, resignation, or at royal command.

President
The President of the Privy Council of Thailand is the head and chief councillor of the privy council. The king retains the power to appoint and remove the president, however the President of the National Assembly of Thailand must countersign presidential appointments and removals, unlike other councillors which the king alone decides.

Functions

The 2017 Constitution gave the privy council many roles and powers. These are mostly associated with the issues surrounding the head of state and the monarchy. A US ambassador described its duties thus, "Statutorily they exist to offer advice to the King if he solicits it, review petitions on his behalf, act as ceremonial stand-ins for the King at various royally-sponsored ceremonies, and play a critical role in succession."

Regency

If the king is incapacitated or for whatever reason and cannot appoint a regent, the privy council will submit to the National Assembly the name of a suitable individual, who must then be approved by a vote. During the period where there is no regent the President of the Privy Council shall be the regent pro tempore. This case is also applicable if the regent is incapacitated and cannot perform his duties. When this happens the President of the Privy Council shall be replaced in his duties to the council by a president pro tempore.

Palace Law of Succession
In regards to the amendment of the 1924 Palace Law of Succession, the king must ask the privy council to draft an amendment. After the king's approval and signature, the President of the Privy Council will notify the president of the National Assembly that will then countersign such amendment.

Vacancy on the throne
When the throne becomes vacant it is the duty of the privy council to submit to the cabinet and to the National Assembly the name of the successor to the throne. During this vacancy period (before the submission) the President of the Privy Council will be the regent pro tempore.

Other functions
Apart from these constitutionally mandated functions the privy councillors also perform other duties. For instance, they carry out other duties in the royal household and on royal projects. Several councillors are members of the Mahidol Foundation, while Dr. Chaovana Nasylvanta is the Director of the Crown Property Bureau. Councillors can, at royal command, attend official functions or carry out official duties on behalf of the king or the royal family.

List of presidents of the Privy Council

Notable members

The Privy Council of Thailand (Rama IX) 

 Prince Rangsit Prayurasakdi
 Prince Dhani Nivat
 Prince Alongkot
 Plot Wichean na Songkhla
 Adul Aduldejjarus
 Prince Vivadhanajaya Jayanta
 Prince Nakkhatra Mangala
 Jit na Songkhla
 Hun Huntagun
 Dej Snidvongs
 Sak Senanarong
 Laihud Tititlanon
 Srisena Sombutsiri
 Gumpan Utaravanit
 Thongchai Chotikasatian
 Chalermlap Tavivong
 Sanya Dharmasakti
 Vongsanuwat Devakula
 Pragob Hutasing
 Uttasit Sittisunton
 Jinda Boonyakom
 Prince Chakkapan Pensiri
 Samran Padtayakul
 Chao Na Sinwan
 Thanin Kraivichien
 Gun Israsena na Ayudhya
 Usni Pramoj
 Gumton Sintavanon
 Prem Tinsulanonda
 Chulanop Snidvongs na Ayudhaya
 Siddhi Savetsila 
 Adulakit Kitiyakara
 Pichit Kullavanich
 Umpon Senanarong
 Jumrus Khemajaru
 Thawisan Ladawan
 Thepkamol Devakula
 Sakda Mokamakkul
 Kasem Wattanachai
 Palakorn Suwannarat
 Sawat Wattanayakon
 Surayud Chulanont
 Santi Thakral
 Chumpol Patjusanon
 Uttanit Ditumnat
 Chanchai Likitjitta
 Supachai Phungam
 Chalit Pukbhasuk

The Privy Council of Thailand (Rama X) 
On 2 December 2016, King Maha Vajiralongkorn reappointed General Prem Tinsulanonda president of the privy council. General Prem became regent pro tempore at the death of King Bhumibol Adulyadej on the 13 October 2016. After Vajiralongkorn accepted the invitation to become king he was able to appoint his own council.

On 6 December 2016 the king appointed ten councillors, seven from his father's council and three new members. Eight members from the previous council were not reappointed.

As of November 2022 the council was composed mostly of retired military leaders and members of the judiciary, with 22 members:

 Prem Tinsulanonda
 Surayud Chulanont
 Kasem Watanachai
 Palakorn Suwannarat
 Chalit Pukbhasuk
 Supachai Phungam
 Charnchai Likhitchittha
 Atthaniti Disatha-Amnarj
 Paiboon Koomchaya
 Dapong Ratanasuwan
 Teerachai Nakwanich
 Wirach Chinvinitkul
 Charunthada Karnasuta
 Kampanat Ruddit
 Pongthep Nuthep
 Chirayu Isarangkun Na Ayuthaya
 Amphon Kittiamphon
 Chalermchai Sitthisart
 Johm Rungsawang
 Nurak Mapraneet
 Kasem Chankaew
 Bundit Malaarisoon

See also
 Monarchy of Thailand
 Chakri Dynasty
 Regent of Thailand
 1924 Palace Law of Succession
 Government of Thailand
 Politics of Thailand
 2006 Thai coup d'état
 Supreme Council of State of Siam

References

External links
 Homepage of the Privy Council of Thailand (English)
 Old Homepage of the Privy Council of Thailand (English)
 List of Members of the Current Privy Council (English)
 Privy Council History (English)

Thai monarchy
Thailand
Royal agencies of Thailand
Organizations established in 1874
1874 establishments in Siam
Network monarchy